The 2002 Asian Women's Junior Handball Championship (7th tournament) took place in Amman from 10 July–15 July. It acts as the Asian qualifying tournament for the 2003 Women's Junior World Handball Championship.

Results

Final standing

References
www.handball.jp (Archived 2009-09-04)

External links
www.asianhandball.com

International handball competitions hosted by Jordan
Asian Women's Junior Handball Championship, 2002
Asia
Asian Handball Championships